O'Chiese Cemetery 203A is an Indian reserve of the O'Chiese First Nation in Alberta, located within Clearwater County. It is 13 kilometres southwest of Rocky Mountain House.

References

Indian reserves in Alberta